September 21 - Eastern Orthodox liturgical calendar - September 23

All fixed commemorations below celebrated on October 5 by Orthodox Churches on the Old Calendar.

For September 22nd, Orthodox Churches on the Old Calendar commemorate the Saints listed on September 9.

Saints
 Prophet Jonah (8th century B.C.)  (see also: September 21 )
 Hieromartyr Phocas, Bishop of Sinope, Wonderworker (117)
 Martyr Phocas the Gardener, of Sinope (320)
 Martyrs Isaac and Martin, by the sword.
 Saint Peter of Constantinople, tax collector in Africa (6th century)
 Venerable Jonah the Sabbaite, the Presbyter (9th century), father of Sts. Theophanes the Hymnographer and Theodore Graptus. (see also: September 21 )

Pre-Schism Western saints
 Saints Digna and Emerita, Virgin-martyrs in Rome under Valerian (c. 259)
 Martyrs Maurice and the Theban Legion, including the officers Candidus and Exuperius, at Agaunum, Gaul (c. 287)
 Saint Jonas (Yon), a companion or disciple of St Dionysius of Paris in France, he was martyred there (3rd century)
 Saint Sanctinus, by tradition the first Bishop of Meaux and a disciple of St Denis of Paris (c. 300)
 Saint Florentius, founder of the monastery of Saint-Florent-le-Vieux (5th century)
 Saint Felix III, Pope of Rome (530)
 Saint Laud of Coutances (Lauto, Laudus, Lô), Bishop of Coutances in France for forty years (528-568) 
 Hieromartyr Emmeram of Regensburg (Emmeramus, Haimhramm), Bishop in Gaul, at Regensburg, Bavaria (652)
 Saint Sadalberga, foundress of the convent of St. John the Baptist at Laon (c. 665)
 Saint Silvanus, a saint venerated from ancient times in Levroux near Bourges in France.

Post-Schism Orthodox saints
 Venerable 26 Martyrs of Zographou Monastery, Mount Athos, martyred by the Latins (1284)  (see also: October 10 )
 Venerable Cosmas, Desert-dweller of Zographou, Mt. Athos (1323)
 Saint Jonah, founder of the Yashezersk Annunciation Monastery, Karelia (1589-1592)
 Saint Macarius, founder of Zhabyn Monastery, Belev (1623)
 Hieromartyr Theodosius of Brazi Monastery, Metropolitan of Moldavia (1694)
 Blessed Parasceva ("Pasha of Sarov"), Fool-for-Christ, of Diveyevo Monastery (1915)

New martyrs and confessors
 New Hieromartyr Benjamin (Voskresensky), Bishop of Romanov (1931)

Other commemorations
 Icon of the Most Holy Theotokos "She Who Is Quick to Hear" (14th century)
 Synaxis of the Saints of Tula.
 Repose of Abbot Innocent of Valaam Monastery (1828)

Icon gallery

Notes

References

Sources
 September 22/October 5. Orthodox Calendar (PRAVOSLAVIE.RU).
 October 5 / September 22. HOLY TRINITY RUSSIAN ORTHODOX CHURCH (A parish of the Patriarchate of Moscow).
 September 22. OCA - The Lives of the Saints.
 The Autonomous Orthodox Metropolia of Western Europe and the Americas (ROCOR). St. Hilarion Calendar of Saints for the year of our Lord 2004. St. Hilarion Press (Austin, TX). p. 71.
 The Twenty-Second Day of the Month of September. Orthodoxy in China.
 September 22. Latin Saints of the Orthodox Patriarchate of Rome.
 The Roman Martyrology. Transl. by the Archbishop of Baltimore. Last Edition, According to the Copy Printed at Rome in 1914. Revised Edition, with the Imprimatur of His Eminence Cardinal Gibbons. Baltimore: John Murphy Company, 1916. pp. 292–293.
 Rev. Richard Stanton. A Menology of England and Wales, or, Brief Memorials of the Ancient British and English Saints Arranged According to the Calendar, Together with the Martyrs of the 16th and 17th Centuries. London: Burns & Oates, 1892. p. 455.
Greek Sources
 Great Synaxaristes:  22 ΣΕΠΤΕΜΒΡΙΟΥ. ΜΕΓΑΣ ΣΥΝΑΞΑΡΙΣΤΗΣ.
  Συναξαριστής. 22 Σεπτεμβρίου. ECCLESIA.GR. (H ΕΚΚΛΗΣΙΑ ΤΗΣ ΕΛΛΑΔΟΣ).
  22/09/2016. Ορθόδοξος Συναξαριστής. 
Russian Sources
  5 октября (22 сентября). Православная Энциклопедия под редакцией Патриарха Московского и всея Руси Кирилла (электронная версия). (Orthodox Encyclopedia - Pravenc.ru).
  22 сентября по старому стилю / 5 октября по новому стилю. Русская Православная Церковь - Православный церковный календарь на 2016 год.

September in the Eastern Orthodox calendar